Muriel Sarkany (born August 5, 1974) is a Belgian professional rock climber. She is known for winning five Climbing World Cups. She also climbs outdoors, and is considered the fourth-ever female climber in history to climb a -graded route (PuntX, Gorges du Loup, FRA).

Climbing career

Competition climbing

Sarkany started climbing at the age of 17 and at the of 18 started participating in international lead climbing competitions.  She became Youth World Champion in Basel in 1992.

She won the silver medal three times for lead climbing at the World Championships (1997, 1999, and 2001), and the gold medal in 2003.

Sarkany was the 1998 European Lead Champion and won the bronze medal at the 2002 European Lead Championships. 

After a break from competition climbing in 2005 and 2006, she returned in 2007 to win the silver medal at the World Championships in Avilles, and the bronze medal at the World Cup that year.

She won the Lead Climbing World Cup 5 times in 1997, 1999, 2001, 2002, and 2003.

She retired in 2010, and as of 2022, still holds the record for the most Lead World Cup gold medals (male or female).

Rock climbing

After retiring from competition climbing, Sarkany devoted herself to outdoor rock climbing.  In November 2013, at the age of 39, she became the fourth-ever woman in history to climb a  graded route when she ascended PuntX in the (Gorges du Loup, FRA).

In 2016, at 43 years old, Sarkany ascended Era Vella in Margalef in Spain, becoming the first woman aged over 40 to climb a  graded route.

Rankings

World Championships Lead Climbing 
Early on, she won a gold medal in the junior category. In the adult difficulty, after three silver medals at the 1997, 1999, and 2001 UIAA Climbing World Championships, Muriel Sarkany became the 2003 World Climbing Champion and is a finalist in the 2007 IFSC Climbing World Championships.

Climbing World Cup 
Muriel won 31 podiums at the World Cup of Difficulty.
 Winner of the difficulty world cup for the years 1997, 1999, 2001, 2002 and 2003.
 Silver medal for the years 1995, 1998, 2000 and 2004.
 Bronze medal in 2007.

Climbing World Championships

Climbing European Championships

Number of medals in the Climbing World Cup

Lead

Other tributes 
She is represented on the  painting in Namur, in Belgium.

Rock climbing

Redpointed routes 
:
 Era Vella - Margalef (ESP) - September 2017
 Punt-X - Gorges du Loup (FRA) - November 21, 2013 - At the time, Sarkany became the 4th female climber in history to climb a 9a route.

:
 La Rubia - Villanueva del Rosario (Andalusia, ESP) - November 2016
 Ultimate Sacrifice - Gorges du Loup (FRA) - 2012

:
 Ingravids Eskerps - Santa Linya (ESP) - March 8, 2012
 Rollito Sharma Extension - Santa Linya - February 4, 2012
 Last soul sacrifice - Gorges du Loup (FRA) - September 30, 2011
 Quoussaï les maux de la fin - Gorges du Loup (FRA) - September 13, 2011
 Hot chili X - Gorges du Loup (FRA) - August 28, 2011
 Drop City - Antalya (TUR) - April 5, 2008

:
 Hot Chilli Beans Volcano - Gorges du Loup (FRA) - August 7, 2011
 Soul Sacrifice - Gorges du Loup (FRA) - July 25, 2011
 Le mur des cyclopes - Saint-Léger-du-Ventoux(FRA)- March 10, 2011
 Collection automne hiver - Saint-Léger-du-Ventoux (FRA) - October 17, 2010
 Trio Ternura - Santa Linya (ESP) - May 31, 2010
 Rolito Sharma - Santa Linya (ESP) - December 10, 2009
 Philippe cuisinière - Rodellar (ESP) - October 3, 2009
 El chorreras - Rodellar (ESP) - September 29, 2009
 Mortal combat - Castillon (FRA) - December 10, 2003
 Skyline - Bürs (AUT) - July 18, 2003

See also
List of grade milestones in rock climbing
History of rock climbing
Rankings of most career IFSC gold medals

References

External links 

1974 births
Living people
Female climbers
Belgian rock climbers
Competitors at the 2005 World Games
IFSC Climbing World Championships medalists
IFSC Climbing World Cup overall medalists